David Allen Zien (born March 15, 1950) is an American politician who represented Wisconsin's 23rd Senate district as a Republican member of the Wisconsin State Senate.

Early life, education and political career
Zien was born in Chippewa Falls, Wisconsin and attended Cadott High School. He has a B.S. from University of Wisconsin–Eau Claire and an M.S. from University of Wisconsin–Stout. Prior to holding elected office, Zien was a campus administrator at Northcentral Technical College. Zien was elected to the Wisconsin State Assembly in 1988 and to the Wisconsin Senate in 1993 in a special election. He became the President pro tempore in 2005. He was defeated in his Fall 2006 re-election campaign by Democrat Pat Kreitlow.

Military service
Zein joined the United States Marines and served with Lima Company, 3rd Battalion, 4th Marine Regiment in the Vietnam War in 1969. While in Vietnam, his unit fought at The Rockpile. He was discharged in 1970. He built a memorial called "Rockpile II" in Wheaton, Wisconsin dedicated to those who served in the Vietnam War.

Motorcycle injury
Zien is well known in Wisconsin for driving through the state on a motorcycle with full-size American and Wisconsin flags. He was inducted in the Motorcycle Hall of Fame in 2000. On March 13, 2011, Zien was seriously injured while traveling in Florida on his motorcycle. Dave Zien logged more than two million miles riding motorcycles before being critically injured in a violent highway crash in Florida. Even though the 61-year-old former state representative and senator lost part of his left leg – and almost his life – in the March crash, he has continued to ride, this time on a three-wheeled Harley-Davidson.

Awards and recognition
During his time in office, Zien was the recipient of many awards, including the following: Legislator of the Year, membership in the American Legion, National MC Hall of Fame inductee with Peter Fonda, NRA Defender of Freedom Award presented by Charlton Heston, Outstanding Legislator, 1995–96, and NFlB Guardian of Small Business, 1995–96. WIAA State Wrestling Qualifier for Cadott High School.

Controversy
On June 21, 2011, Zien and two Tea Party members were accused of harassing and assaulting members of the Solidarity Sing Along group in the Wisconsin State Capitol. Zien allegedly ran over group members' belongings with his wheelchair.

Notes

1950 births
Living people
Republican Party Wisconsin state senators
Republican Party members of the Wisconsin State Assembly
University of Wisconsin–Eau Claire alumni
University of Wisconsin–Stout alumni
Military personnel from Wisconsin
21st-century American politicians
United States Marine Corps personnel of the Vietnam War
United States Marines
American veterans activists